Ogcocephalus rostellum, the palefin batfish, is a species of fish in the anglerfish genus in the batfish family Ogcocephalidae.

The fish is found in the Western Atlantic Ocean from North Carolina and the Florida Keys to Jamaica.

References

Ogcocephalidae
Taxa named by Margaret G. Bradbury
Fish described in 1980